Croatian Home Guard may refer to several historic military formations:

Royal Croatian Home Guard (1868–1918), regular army of the Kingdom of Croatia-Slavonia, then part of the Austro-Hungarian Monarchy
Croatian Home Guard (World War II) (1941–1944), regular army of the Independent State of Croatia
Home Guard (1991–2003), reserve force of the Croatian Army
Home Guard (1992–1995), section of the Croatian Defence Council which operated in present-day Bosnia and Herzegovina